Polyptychoides afarissaque is a moth of the  family Sphingidae. It is known from Ethiopia.

References

Polyptychoides
Moths described in 2004